Karl Telford Frederick (February 2, 1881 – February 11, 1963) was an American sport shooter who competed in the 1920 Summer Olympics.

In 1920 he won the gold medal in the individual free pistol event. And he won two gold medals as member of the American team in the team 50 metre free pistol competition and in the team 30 metre military pistol event. He also participated in the individual 30 metre military pistol competition but his place is unknown.

He was born in Chateaugay, New York and graduated from Princeton University and Harvard Law School.

Frederick served as president of the National Rifle Association (from 1934 to 1935) and vice president of the US Revolver Association. He testified during hearings on the National Firearms Act in 1934, saying "I have never believed in the general practice of carrying weapons. I seldom carry one. I have when I felt it was desirable to do so for my own protection. I know that applies in most of the instances where guns are used effectively in self-defense or in places of business and in the home. I do not believe in the general promiscuous toting of guns. I think it should be sharply restricted and only under licenses." Following discussion on the criminal element obtaining weapons, he said "I believe in regulatory methods. I think that makes it desirable that any such regulations imposed should not impose undue hardships on the law-abiding citizens and that they should not obstruct him in the right of self-defense, but that they should be directed exclusively, so far as possible, to suppressing the criminal use, or punishing the criminal use of weapons."

See also
List of Princeton University Olympians

References

External links
profile Karl Frederick profile

1881 births
1963 deaths
American male sport shooters
United States Distinguished Marksman
ISSF pistol shooters
Shooters at the 1920 Summer Olympics
Olympic gold medalists for the United States in shooting
Olympic medalists in shooting
Presidents of the National Rifle Association
Medalists at the 1920 Summer Olympics
People from Chateaugay, New York
Sportspeople from New York (state)
Princeton University alumni
Harvard Law School alumni
19th-century American people
20th-century American people